Thelasis capitata, commonly known as the conical fly orchid, is a plant in the orchid family. It is a clump-forming epiphyte with flattened pseudobulbs, each with a single strap-shaped leaf. A large number of small yellowish green flowers are arranged in a cone shape on a thin but stiff flowering stem. This orchid is found from Thailand to Malesia, including on Christmas Island.

Description
The flowers open one after the other in a spiral sequence, each flower lasting a few days. The petals are shorter and narrower than the dorsal sepal. Flowering occurs between April and June.

Taxonomy and naming
Thelasis capitata was first formally described in 1825 by Carl Ludwig Blume who published the description in Bijdragen tot de flora van Nederlandsch Indië. The specific epithet (capitata) is a Latin word meaning "having a head".

Distribution and habitat
The conical fly orchid usually grows on rainforest trees. It is found in Thailand, Borneo, Java, the Maluku Islands, the Philippines, Sulawesi, Sumatra and Christmas Island.

References

capitata
Plants described in 1825
Flora of Christmas Island
Orchids of Indonesia